Double Crossing is a Hardy Boys and Nancy Drew Supermystery crossover novel. It was published in 1988 under the Carolyn Keene pseudonym.

Plot summary
Nancy and George are on a cruise ship in the Caribbean, with George being the "social director" of the whole establishment. The two are having fun when suddenly, Nancy realizes of a plot involving the sale of CIA secrets, and a secret agent. Meanwhile, the Hardys are in the ship, going undercover as a photographer and a waiter, to pursue a group of burglars who target wealthy men and women.

References

External links
Double Crossing at Fantastic Fiction
Supermystery series books

Supermystery
1988 American novels
1988 children's books
Novels set on ships
Novels set in the Caribbean